Serenade is a 1956 film directed by Anthony Mann and starring tenor Mario Lanza, Joan Fontaine, Sara Montiel (billed as Sarita Montiel), and Vincent Price. Based on the 1937 novel Serenade by James M. Cain, the film was a Warner Bros. release, Lanza's fifth film, and his first on-screen appearance in four years.

Plot
Serenade tells the story of poor vineyard worker Damon Vincenti (Mario Lanza), who becomes an operatic tenor, and is involved with two women — one a high society hostess, Kendall Hale (Joan Fontaine), the other a Mexican bullfighter's daughter, Juana Montes (Sara Montiel). The tenor has a breakdown because of his unrequited love for the society woman, but finds love (and a happy ending) with the Mexican girl. Highly melodramatic, the film features a great deal of operatic music, all of it sung by Lanza. Of note are the Act III Monologue from Verdi's Otello and an extract from the duet "Dio ti giocondi" from the same opera featuring Metropolitan Opera soprano Licia Albanese.

Cast
 Mario Lanza as Damon Vincenti
 Joan Fontaine as Kendall Hale
 Sara Montiel as Juana Montes (as Sarita Montiel)
 Vincent Price as Charles Winthrop
 Joseph Calleia as Maestro Marcatello
 Harry Bellaver as Tonio
 Vince Edwards as Marco Roselli
 Silvio Minciotti as Lardelli
 Frank Puglia as Manuel Montes
 Edward Platt as Everett Carter
 Licia Albanese as Desdemona in Otello
 Jean Fenn as Soprano in San Francisco

Differences from the source novel
The movie differs greatly from the James M. Cain source novel. In the book, the male protagonist is John Howard Sharp, a professional opera singer who has lost his voice and fled the United States to Mexico in a crisis of confidence after being sexually wooed (not unsuccessfully, though details are vague) by a male socialite and impresario. Juana Montes is a Mexican prostitute who sees Sharp as gay and therefore a trouble-free partner to open a brothel with. But after having sex in a deserted church with Juana, Sharp recovers his voice and his preferred sexual identity. The two lovers come into conflict with the local police and flee to Los Angeles, where Sharp reestablishes his singing career, more successful than ever. But once they move to New York, the singer must struggle against the renewed blandishments of the gay impresario, whom Juana eventually murders with a torero's sword. As none of this material could be considered suitable for an American movie in 1956, the story's male impresario becomes female instead and the Mexican prostitute becomes a Mexican bullfighter's daughter.

Production
Film rights to the novel were bought in 1946 by the production company of Michael Curtiz.

Songs 
 "Serenade"
 "My Destiny"

Reception
Reviewing the film in The New York Times, A. H. Weiler wrote that Lanza, "who was never in better voice, makes this a full and sometimes impressive musical entertainment."

The film suffered a purported loss of $695,000.

See also
List of American films of 1956

Bibliography
 Cesari, Armando. Mario Lanza: An American Tragedy. (Fort Worth: Baskerville 2004)

References

External links 
 
 
 
 
 "Serenade – An Underrated Treasure", by Derek McGovern
Review at Variety

1956 films
1950s musical drama films
1956 romantic drama films
1950s romantic musical films
American musical drama films
American romantic drama films
American romantic musical films
1950s English-language films
Films based on works by James M. Cain
Films directed by Anthony Mann
Films about opera
Warner Bros. films
Films produced by Henry Blanke
1950s American films